The Indian Reunification Association (IRA) is an organization whose purpose as set out on its website is "to unify what is now Pakistan and Bangladesh with India under a secular government".  It was founded on April 2, 2017, by Markandey Katju, a former Justice of the Supreme Court of India, who  serves as the patron of the association.

Under the leadership of Markandey Katju and Irfan Pullani, the Indian Reunification Association launched the Border Peace Forum (BPF) in February 2021 to advance peace, trade and harmony between India and Pakistan.

On February 21, 2021, Markandey Katju transferred the office of chair to Indervansh Chaddha and Markandey Katju serves as the patron of the Indian Reunification Association.

Background 

The Indian Reunification Association was founded by Markandey Katju, the former Justice of the Supreme Court of India, on April 2, 2017. It was founded upon the philosophy that historically, geopolitically and culturally, India with its boundaries before the 1947 partition, has been one united nation entity in which there has always been free flow migration among people. Katju shares that South Asia or Hindustan "is broadly a country of immigrants like North America. The ancestors of 92 to 93 percent people living today in our subcontinent were not the original inhabitants here, but came from outside, mainly from the northwest (the original inhabitants being the pre-Dravidian tribals)." Due to this historical disposition, diversity was prevalent in the region, therefore, subjugating a particular ideology, specifically the recent religious identity divide, is a counter productive strategy in unity. The partition of India occurred through colonial divide and rule tactics administered during the British Raj and divided upon independence to stunt the economic progress of the region to prevent the "Indian industry to emerge as a powerful rival to British industry." Therefore, the lack of economic progress is, in part, attributed to the legacy of colonialism that continues to dictate current borders issues in the Kashmir Conflict.

See also 
Opposition to the partition of India
Composite nationalism
Hindu-Muslim unity
Religious harmony in India
Korean Unification Flag

References

External links

Official website

Organisations based in India
Political organizations established in 2017